Russell Morgan (April 29, 1904 – August 7, 1969) was an American big band leader and arranger during the 1930s and 1940s. He was best known for being the one of the composers of the song "You're Nobody till Somebody Loves You", with Larry Stock and James Cavanaugh, and was the first to record it in 1944.

Biography

Early life
Born into a Welsh family in Scranton, Pennsylvania, United States, Morgan was encouraged to express himself musically from the age of seven. His father, a coal mine foreman, was a former musician who played drums in a local band in his spare time. Morgan's mother had been a pianist in a vaudeville act. Morgan began to study piano and worked in the mines to earn money to help support his family and pay for his lessons.

At the age of 14, Morgan earned money as a pianist in a theater in Scranton. He purchased a trombone and learned to play it. In 1921, he played trombone with the Scranton Sirens, which became popular in Pennsylvania during the 1920s. Besides Morgan, several of its members became famous, including Jimmy Dorsey on saxophone and clarinet, Billy Lustig on violin, and Tommy Dorsey on trombone, taking Morgan's place when Morgan left the band.

Early career
In 1922, Morgan moved to New York. Three years later, at the age of twenty-one, he wrote arrangements for John Philip Sousa and Victor Herbert. He then joined Paul Specht's orchestra and toured throughout Europe with the orchestra. Colleagues of Morgan in Specht's orchestra included Arthur Schutt, Don Lindley, Chauncey Morehouse, Orville Knapp, Paul Whiteman, Charlie Spivak, and Artie Shaw.

After returning from Europe, Jean Goldkette invited Morgan to Detroit to lead his band. Some members of the Goldkette Orchestra were former associates. The band included Tommy and Jimmy Dorsey, Chauncey Morehouse, Joe Venuti, Eddie Lang, Bix Beiderbecke, and Fuzzy Farrar.

Morgan's first records were made for OKeh in mid 1930 for Parlophone and Odeon, usually under the name "Russell Brown and his Orchestra". During the early 1930s, Morgan joined the group of anonymous studio groups recording pop tunes for the dime store labels, which included Banner, Melotone, Oriole, Perfect, Romeo, Conqueror, and Vocalion.

For a short time in 1934, Morgan arranged for Fletcher Henderson's Orchestra. In 1935, he played trombone with the Original Dixieland Jazz Band when they recorded four sides for Vocalion. On September 12, 1935, Morgan, playing piano and Joe Venuti on violin recorded two sides for Brunswick: "Red Velvet" and "Black Satin". Most of the songs were written by Morgan and Venuti.

Radio work
Morgan's biggest success came when he was offered the position of musical director for Detroit radio station WXYZ. His show, Music in the Morgan Manner, became one of the most popular radio shows. At one time during his radio run, he was directing nine commercial programs. While in Detroit, he did arranging for the Detroit 102 piece Symphony Orchestra.

In the early 1930s, Morgan was in an automobile accident that almost ended his career. After several months in the hospital, he started again in New York City as an arranger for the George White Scandals, the Cotton Club Revue, and the Capitol Theatre. When not arranging for the Broadway shows, Morgan worked as a pianist or trombonist with orchestras led by Phil Spitalny, Eddie Gilligan, Ted Fio Rito, and Freddy Martin.

Russ Morgan joined the Freddy Martin Orchestra in 1934 as a pianist but worked chiefly as a trombonist and arranger with the band. While with Martin's orchestra, he was music director at Brunswick in New York, where he met Shirley Gray, whom he married in 1939.

He hosted The Russ Morgan Show on the Mutual Broadcasting System beginning in September 1949. Originating from San Francisco, the show featured Morgan "as master of ceremonies of a program built around guest entertainers."

Mid-career
While at Brunswick, Morgan met Rudy Vallee, who was impressed with his ability. Vallee insisted he form an orchestra of his own. He then invited Morgan to appear as a guest on his popular Fleishman Yeast radio show. Vallee was instrumental in getting Morgan his first engagement in New York City, along with his own orchestra, at the Biltmore Hotel. This first engagement was indicative of the audience's reaction to Morgan's appearances. He started with a four-week contract. The contract was extended, and Morgan remained at the hotel for two years. During the next few years, he was music director for the Rinso-Lifebuoy Show on NBC for thirty-nine weeks and the Philip Morris radio series on NBC and CBS for two years.

Russ Morgan's band had regular engagements at the Biltmore Hotel, Los Angeles; Claremont Hotel, Berkeley, California; Edgewater Beach Hotel, Chicago; Aragon and Trianon, Chicago; Strand, Chicago; the Statler Hotel, New York; Orpheum, Los Angeles; and the Palladium in Hollywood.

Chart success
In 1949, Morgan had four songs on the charts. They were "So Tired", "Cruising Down the River", "Sunflower" and "Forever and Ever". On the latter he used a vocal quartet that was starting out and would become famous as the Ames Brothers. The Decca recording of "Dogface Soldier", released to coincide with the film version of To Hell and Back, based on the best-selling novel by Audie Murphy, sold over 300,000 copies.

Late career and death
In 1950, Russ Morgan hosted In the Morgan Manner on ABC television. In 1953, Russ Morgan And His Orchester released "The Tennessee Wig-Walk" as a single. Morgan had another TV program on CBS in 1956 with Helen O'Connell as the featured singer. In 1958, Morgan's nineteen-piece band had been reduced to eleven men, with his sons Jack Morgan on trombone and David Morgan on guitar. In 1965, he was booked for an eight-week engagement at the Top o' the Strip at the Dunes Hotel in Las Vegas. The engagement lasted until 1977.

In 1969, Morgan died at the age of 65 in Las Vegas. Morgan's son Jack took over the leadership of the band. Morgan has a star on the Hollywood Walk of Fame for his contributions to recording.

References

External links
 
 
 Russ Morgan recordings at the Discography of American Historical Recordings

1904 births
1969 deaths
Musicians from Scranton, Pennsylvania
American jazz bandleaders
Big band bandleaders
Decca Records artists
Vee-Jay Records artists
20th-century American musicians
Jazz musicians from Pennsylvania
Victor Recording Orchestra members